Konkovo is a station on the Kaluzhsko-Rizhskaya Line of the Moscow Metro.

Design
It was designed by N. Shumakov, G. Mun, and N. Shurygina and opened on 6 November 1987 with the southward extension of the line. The station is of a single vault design, the only one on the radius. Its cross-section is meant to resemble two rows of sickles with the blades pointing inward, a design feature enhanced by the recessed light fixtures and metal accent strips in the spaces between the plaster ceiling panels. The bases of the vault is strongly recessed and faced with reddish ceramic tile.

The entrances to Konkovo are located at the intersection of Profsoyuznaya and Ostrovityanov streets.

Traffic
Its daily passenger traffic is 46,400 passengers.

Moscow Metro stations
Railway stations in Russia opened in 1987
Kaluzhsko-Rizhskaya Line
Railway stations located underground in Russia